Molinos de viento may refer to:
 "Molinos de viento" (Mägo de Oz song), 1998
 , by Spanish composer Pablo Luna